The WEY VV5 is a compact crossover SUV manufactured by Great Wall Motor under the WEY brand.

Overview
The VV5, formerly known as the 02 during development phase shares the same platform as the WEY VV7 and the second generation Haval H6.

The WEY VV5 is powered by a 1.5 liter inline-4 turbo engine producing 171hp or a 2.0 liter inline-4 turbo engine producing 227hp, with both engine options mated to a 7-speed dual-clutch transmission.

References

VV5
compact sport utility vehicles
Front-wheel-drive vehicles
All-wheel-drive vehicles
Cars introduced in 2017
Cars of China